Richard Spong (born 23 September 1983) is a Swedish footballer who plays as a midfielder.

Career
Spong began his career as a youth player with IK Frej and IF Brommapojkarna, before moving to England with Coventry City in 1999 where he didn't make a single first team appearance. He returned to Sweden in 2002 with Djurgårdens IF, later signing with IFK Norrköping in 2005. He signed for GAIS in the 2009 season.

Honours
 Djurgårdens IF
 Allsvenskan: 2003

References

External links
 
 Elite Prospects profile

1983 births
Living people
Swedish footballers
Sweden youth international footballers
Allsvenskan players
IF Brommapojkarna players
Coventry City F.C. players
IFK Norrköping players
Djurgårdens IF Fotboll players
GAIS players
Expatriate footballers in England
IK Frej players
Association football midfielders
Association football defenders
People from Falun
Sportspeople from Dalarna County